Thomas Dorby Sermanni (born 1 July 1954) is a Scottish football coach and former professional player, who mostly works in women's football. He has previously managed the Australia women's national team, the United States women's national team from 2013 to 2014, the Orlando Pride of the National Women's Soccer League from 2016 to 2018, and the New Zealand women's national team from 2018 to 2021.

Playing career
Born in Glasgow, Sermanni played as a midfielder in Scotland, England, Australia and New Zealand for Cumbernauld United, Albion Rovers, Blackpool, Torquay United, Dunfermline Athletic, Canberra City and Christchurch United. His nephew Peter was also a footballer who later moved to Australia.

Coaching career

Australian clubs
Sermanni has coached a number of Australian club sides, including Canberra Metros and Canberra Cosmos.

Women's United Soccer Association (WUSA), 2001–2003
In 2001 Sermanni was an assistant coach for the Bay Area CyberRays of the Women's United Soccer Association (WUSA). The CyberRays won the league's inaugural championship, the Founders Cup. He remained an assistant coach in 2002 when the team changed its name to the San Jose CyberRays. In 2003, he was hired as head coach of the New York Power (WUSA), who had fired their previous coach after finishing their 2002 season with a dismal record of 3 wins, 17 losses, and 1 draw (10 pts). With Sermanni as their coach, the team improved to finish the 2003 season in fifth place with a record of 7 wins, 9 losses and 5 draws, or 26 points.

Australia women's national team

Sermanni took up a job as coach of Australia women in December 2004, having previously also coached the team between 1994 and 1997.
Among his accomplishments as coach of Australia women, are quarter-finals at 2007 and 2011 FIFA Women's World Cup.

United States women's national team
On 30 October 2012, US Soccer Federation announced that starting 1 January 2013, Sermanni would be the head coach of the United States women's national soccer team, ending his long-time association with Australia.

Sermanni finished his first year as manager of USA unbeaten with 13 wins and 3 draws. The 3 draws are 1–1 against Sweden at the Algarve Cup, and 2 friendlies, 3–3 with Germany,
and 1–1 with New Zealand.
For the second time the United States posted an unbeaten record in a year that featured a double-digit number of matches. In addition, the team won the 2013 Algarve Cup.

The United States women started 2014 with friendlies, under Sermanni, a 1–0 win over Canada,
and 7–0 and 8–0 drubbings of Russia.
At the 2014 Algarve Cup, the United States women did not win a game in group stage: 1–1 with Japan, 0–1 loss to Sweden and a 3–5 loss to Denmark. The team finished seventh with a 3–0 win over Korea DPR, the lowest the team had finished at the Algarve Cup, which the team had won 9 times.

On 6 April 2014, Sermanni was relieved of his coaching duties following a 2–0 win over China in an international friendly.

Canada women's national team
In 2014 Sermanni joined Canada women's national soccer team's coaching staff as technical consultant. Sermanni was on contract as an assistant coach to Canada during 2015 FIFA Women's World Cup.

National Women's Soccer League
On 20 October 2015, Orlando City Soccer Club announced the creation of a women's team Orlando Pride to join National Women's Soccer League in 2016, and Sermanni would be the first coach for the expansion club. On 14 September 2018 after a disappointing 2018 season where the Orlando Pride finished in 7th place, Sermanni and the Orlando Pride mutually parted ways. Sermanni had a record of 24–29–14 in 3 seasons in Orlando and qualified for the playoffs in 2017.

New Zealand women
On 26 October 2018, Sermanni was appointed the new head coach of New Zealand women's team. He was released after 2020 Summer Olympics.

Honours

Manager 
Australia
OFC Women's Championship: 1994
AFF Women's Championship: 2008
AFC Women's Asian Cup: 2010

United States
The Algarve Cup: 2013

New Zealand
OFC Women's Nations Cup: 2018

Individual 
AFC Coach of the Year: 2007
ACT Sport Hall of Fame: 2012 (Associate Member)

References

Match reports

External links
 Tom Sermanni at Aussie Footballers

1954 births
Living people
Footballers from Glasgow
Scottish footballers
Scottish football managers
Cumbernauld United F.C. players
Albion Rovers F.C. players
Blackpool F.C. players
Torquay United F.C. players
Dunfermline Athletic F.C. players
Scottish Football League players
English Football League players
National Soccer League (Australia) players
Scottish expatriate footballers
Expatriate soccer players in Australia
Association football midfielders
Scottish expatriate football managers
Scottish expatriate sportspeople in Australia
Scottish expatriate sportspeople in New Zealand
Scottish expatriate sportspeople in the United States
Expatriate association footballers in New Zealand
1995 FIFA Women's World Cup managers
2007 FIFA Women's World Cup managers
2011 FIFA Women's World Cup managers
United States women's national soccer team managers
Australian Institute of Sport coaches
National Women's Soccer League coaches
Orlando Pride coaches
Canberra City FC players
2019 FIFA Women's World Cup managers
Scottish emigrants to Australia
Scottish people of Italian descent
Scottish Junior Football Association players
Australia women's national soccer team managers
Association football player-managers
New Zealand women's national football team managers
Women's United Soccer Association coaches